First impression or first impressions may refer to:

Terminology
First impression (law), legal term for (a) the initial presentation to a court of a particular question of law, or (b) a case which sets forth a completely original issue of law for decision by the courts
 Prima facie
First impression (psychology), a term used in psychology
First edition, or first impression, the first printing of a book or other printed publication

Film and television
First Impressions (TV series), a 1988 American situation comedy that aired on CBS
First Impressions (game show), aka. First Impressions with Dana Carvey, a 2016 American television game show that aired on USA Network
"First Impressions" (Angel), a 2000 episode of the television series Angel

Literature
First Impressions, the original title of Jane Austen's novel Pride and Prejudice

Music
First Impressions (musical), a 1959 Broadway musical based on Pride and Prejudice
First Impressions (album), by Olivia Newton-John, 1974
First Impressions, an album by the Impressions, or the title song, 1975
First Impressions, an album by Tom Harrell, 2015
First Impressions (James TW EP), 2016
First Impressions (Thrice EP), 1999